"Don't Wanna Lose You" is a song by Cuban-American singer-songwriter Gloria Estefan, released on June 21, 1989 as the first single by Epic Records from her debut solo album, Cuts Both Ways (1989).

International versions
Estefan also recorded "Si Voy a Perderte," which is the Spanish version of this song, (translated as "If I Am Going to Lose You.") "Si Voy a Perderte," also included on Cuts Both Ways, hit number one on Billboard's Hot Latin Tracks chart.

"Se tenho que te perder", (also translated as "If I've Got to Lose You") is the Portuguese version of this song, and was released as a single in Brazil, and as a bonus track on international editions of Estefan's Into the Light album. The Portuguese version was less successful than the English original, which ended being the fourth more heard song in Brazilian radio in 1989.

A rerecorded version of "Don't Wanna Lose You" was included in Estefan's 2020 album Brazil305.

Critical reception
Bill Coleman from Billboard wrote that the "emotive slow number" "I Don't Wanna Lose You" showcases the singer's "sensitive vocal." A reviewer from Entertainment Weekly felt that it "croon along smoothly". Pan-European magazine Music & Media complimented the song as "a strong, melodic and well put together ballad that will undoubtedly do well." Jerry Smith from Music Week declared it as "another epic ballad, superbly sung and sure to see the Miami sound gain prominence this side of the Atlantic." Pat Thomas from Number One called it a "big ballad". William Shaw from Smash Hits viewed it as a "scarf-swaying ballad of gargantuan soppiness." He added, "It's rather simple, not over the top, and Gloria — who wrote the song — doesn't wreck it by going too excessively mad on the vocal front. Poignant, I think the word is."

Retrospective response
In an 2019 retrospective review, Matthew Hocter from Albumism wrote, "If ever a solo debut was to make its mark, this one well and truly did and this was never more evident than on the album’s lead single 'Don’t Wanna Lose You'". AllMusic editor Jason Birchmeier praised the song as "super". Another editor, Jon O'Brien, complimented it as "beautiful". In 2014, Maryann Scheufele from AXS ranked it among Gloria Estefan's 10 Best Songs, adding that Estefan "inspires women to stand their ground and keep their love." In 2013, Pip Ellwood-Hughes from Entertainment Focus featured the song in their list of "Our Top 10 Gloria Estefan Singles", describing it as a "power ballad". In an 2016 review of the album, Pop Rescue found that "I Don't Wanna Lose You" sees Estefan "pitched against a wonderful synthscape and simple pop-rock beat. Occasional electric guitar chips in, but this is a song about giving Gloria enough space to sing her heartfelt lyrics over a somewhat minimal track."

Song nominations
The song earned a Grammy Award nomination for Best Female Pop Vocal Performance but lost against Bonnie Raitt's "Nick of Time." Her live performance of the song at the 1990 Grammy Awards was released on the 1994 album Grammy's Greatest Moments Volume I.
It also received an American Music Award for Favorite Pop/Rock Single but lost to Milli Vanilli's "Girl I'm Gonna Miss You."

Charts and certifications

Weekly charts

Year-end charts

Certifications

Formats and track listings

Release history

Cover versions
It was covered by Glee's Amber Riley in "The Spanish Teacher" episode using some of the lyrics from the Spanish version of the song.

Il Divo, the vocal quartet of male singers; Swiss tenor Urs Buhler, Spanish baritone Carlos Marin, American tenor David Miller and French pop singer Sébastien Izambard, along with Colombian producer winner of multiple Grammy Latino Julio Reyes Copello, recorded the song for the album Amor & Pasión from Il Divo (2015).

See also
Hot 100 number-one hits of 1989 (United States)
Number-one hits of 1989 (U.S. Hot Latin Tracks)

References

External links
Web.archive.org
Romantic-lyrics.com

1980s ballads
1989 songs
1989 debut singles
Billboard Hot 100 number-one singles
Cashbox number-one singles
Gloria Estefan songs
Pop ballads
Songs written by Gloria Estefan
Song recordings produced by Emilio Estefan
Epic Records singles